Cyphoma versicolor is a species of sea snail, a marine gastropod mollusc in the family Ovulidae, the ovulids, cowry allies or false cowries.

Description
The maximum recorded shell length is 21 mm.

Habitat
It has been recorded at depths of 45 to 50 m.

References

Ovulidae
Gastropods described in 2003